Beech Mountain is a mountain in the North Carolina High Country and wholly in the Pisgah National Forest.  Its elevation reaches 5,506 feet (1,657 m) and generates feeder streams for the Elk River.  Nestled on the top is the Town of Beech Mountain.

Recreation

Beech Mountain offers skiing, snowboarding, and tubing in the winter months. In the summer, recreation includes hiking and mountain biking. Beech Mountain Resort runs chairlifts for downhill mountain biking.

One of the more interesting walking areas is the defunct Land of Oz theme park, which existed briefly in the 1970s; remnants of the park can be visited today.

See also
List of mountains in North Carolina

References

Mountains of North Carolina
Mountains of Avery County, North Carolina